Galeatus spinifrons is a species of lace bug in the family Tingidae. It is found in Europe and Northern Asia (excluding China) and North America.

References

Further reading

 
 

Tingidae
Articles created by Qbugbot
Insects described in 1807